Erwinia is a genus of Enterobacterales bacteria containing mostly plant pathogenic species which was named for the famous plant pathologist, Erwin Frink Smith. It contains Gram-negative bacteria related to Escherichia coli, Shigella, Salmonella, and Yersinia. They are primarily rod-shaped bacteria.

Many infect woody plants. A well-known member of this genus is the species E. amylovora, which causes fire blight on apples, pears, and other Rosaceae crops; E. tracheiphila, though, causes bacterial wilt of cucurbits. Other familiar species, such as E. carotovora (another major cause of plant diseases), are more distantly related to the fire blight bacterium, and have been moved to genera Brenneria, Dickeya, and Pectobacterium.

Erwinia aphidocola and E. persicina species were both observed to be present within the floral nectar microbial community of seven different orchid (Epipactis) flower species. E. aphidicola appears to display characteristics of a pathogen as it had decimated fifty percent of a bean crop in Spain in late 2003.

Erwinia rhapontici has been identified as a plant pathogen that produces a distinct diffusible pink pigment on sucrose-peptone agar and creates pink seeds in the hosts. It is also found to be a wound pathogen. Wound pathogens are replicating microorganisms in a wound that can cause the host injury. It is possible that the bacterium can penetrate though young pea pods through wounds or injuries and infect seeds produced in the pod, causing deformed leaves.

Species
Species in Erwinia are:
 Erwinia amylovora (Fire blight)
 Erwinia aphidicola
 Erwinia billingiae
 Erwinia endophytica
 Erwinia gerundensis
 Erwinia iniecta
 Erwinia mallotivora
 Erwinia oleae
 Erwinia papayae
 Erwinia persicina
 Erwinia piriflorinigrans
 Erwinia psidii
 Erwinia pyrifoliae
 Erwinia rhapontici
 Erwinia tasmaniensis
 Erwinia teleogrylli
 Erwinia toletana
 Erwinia tracheiphila
 Erwinia typographi
 Erwinia uredovora
 Erwinia uzenensis

Dickeya dadantii was formerly classified as Erwinia chrysanthemi.

References

Bacterial plant pathogens and diseases
Bacteria genera
Enterobacterales